The SVB Cup (Dutch: Beker van Suriname) is a competition organized by the Surinamese Football Association (Dutch: Surinaamse Voetbal Bond (SVB)) since 1992. It was based on the size of the KNVB Cup. The tournament consists of all teams from the top two layers of the Surinamese Football League Eerste Divisie and District Divisions.

History

The tournament began in the 1992 season. The first champion was the PVV. In 2007, the SV Robinhood won for the fifth time, becoming the largest tournament champion

Past finals

Number of titles

References

External links
Surinam - List of (Super) Cup Winners, RSSSF.com

 
1
Suriname